Roland Lesaffre (1927–2009) was a French film actor. He appeared in many films directed by Marcel Carné.

Selected filmography

 La présidente (1938)
 L'embuscade (1941)
 La Marie du port (1950) - Un marin (uncredited)
 Juliette, or Key of Dreams (1951) - Le légionnaire
 The Strange Madame X (1951) - Roland - le garçon de café (uncredited)
 Paris Is Always Paris (1951)
 Le Plaisir (1952) - Bit part (uncredited)
 Casque d'Or (1952) - Anatole (waiter)
 We Are All Murderers (1952) - Le détenu-coiffeur
 When You Read This Letter (1953) - Roland
 Thérèse Raquin (1953) - Riton, le matelot maître-chanteur
 The Love of a Woman (1953) - Yves
 The Air of Paris  (1954) - André Ménard
 To Catch a Thief (1955) - Claude (uncredited)
 If Paris Were Told to Us (1956) - Le premier royaliste
 Law of the Streets (1956) - Le grêle
 Hadashi no seishun (1956) - Father Simenon
 Soupçons (1956) - Raymond Dellez
 Crime and Punishment (1956) - L'ouvrier accusé
 Méfiez-vous fillettes (1957) - Paul
 Filous et compagnie (1957) - Fernand, le chauffeur
 La Bonne Tisane (1958) - Roger
 Le Piège (1958) - Undetermined Role (uncredited)
 Young Sinners (1958) - Roger
 Le 7eme jour de Saint-Malo (1960) - François - un guide malouin
 Amour, Autocar et Boîtes de nuit (1960) - Albert
 Wasteland (1960) - Big Chief
 La Fête espagnole (1961) - Marcel Nancini
 Les Menteurs (1961) - Clement
 Ursus and the Tartar Princess (1961) - Ivan
 Du mouron pour les petits oiseaux (1963) - Monsieur Clec - le tailleur
 The Accident (1963) - Le Goualec
 Les Parias de la gloire (1964) - La Coquille
 Le Bluffeur (1964) - Philippe
 L'étrange auto-stoppeuse (1964)
 L'Or du duc (1965) - Le chauffeur de la RATP
 Three Rooms in Manhattan (1965) - Pierre
 Pas de panique (1966) - François Toussaint
 Star Pilot (1966) - Prof. Solmi
 The Young Wolves (1968) - Albert
 Le Bal des voyous (1968) - Inspector Fougas
 Traquenards (1969) - Bob
 Le bourgeois gentil mec (1969) - L'inspecteur
 L'amour, oui! Mais... (1970) - Flou-Flou
 Atlantic Wall (1970) - Le faux résistant
 Les enfants de Caïn (1970)
 Law Breakers (1971) - Saugeat
 Les coups pour rien (1971) - Michel
 Kisss..... (1971) - Le flic en civil de Dieppe
 La Merveilleuse Visite (1974) - Ménard
 Maître Pygmalion (1975)
 Il faut vivre dangereusement (1975) - Edouard Lory
 El avispero (1976)
 Arch of Triumph (1980)
 Salut... j'arrive! (1982) - L'agent à la fourrière
 Bernadette (1988) - François Soubirous
 La passion de Bernadette (1990)
 Dames galantes (1990) - Canillac

References

Bibliography
 Edward Baron Turk. Child of Paradise: Marcel Carné and the Golden Age of French Cinema. Harvard University Press, 1989.

External links

1927 births
2009 deaths
French male film actors